Falkenhof Glacier is a tributary glacier  long, flowing west from the vicinity of Tricorn Mountain to enter Snakeskin Glacier northwest of Mount Clarke, Antarctica. It was named by the Advisory Committee on Antarctic Names for Jack J. Falkenhof, a United States Antarctic Research Program meteorologist at South Pole Station, 1963.

References 

Glaciers of Dufek Coast